Maryna may refer to:

People 
 Maryna Antsybor (born 1987), Ukrainian cross country skier
 Maryna Arzamasava (born 1987), Belarusian middle-distance runner
 Maryna Bazhanova (born 1962), Ukrainian former handball player
 Maryna Dubrova (born 1978), Ukrainian long-distance runner
 Maryna Dyachenko, Ukrainian author and Playwright
 Maryna Hancharova (born 1990), Belarusian rhythmic gymnast
 Maryna Hrymych (born 1961), Ukrainian novelist and academician
 Maryna Konieva (born 1987), Ukrainian taekwondo athlete
 Maryna Linchuk (born 1987), Belarusian fashion model
 Maryna Maydanova (born 1982), Ukrainian sprinter
 Maryna Moroz
 Maryna Novik (born 1984), Belarusian female javelin thrower
 Maryna Pautaran, Belarusian canoer
 Maryna Piddubna (born 1998), Ukrainian Paralympic swimmer
 Maryna Prokofyeva (born 1982), Ukrainian judo ka
 Maryna Pryshchepa (born 1983), Ukrainian judoka
 Maryna Shkermankova (born 1990), Belarusian weightlifter
 Maryna Shukyurava (born 1980), Belarusian rock singer
 Maryna Sokolyan (born 1979), Ukrainian author
 Maryna Vergelyuk (born 1978), Ukrainian team handball player
 Maryna Viazovska (born 1984), Ukrainian mathematician
 Maryna Zanevska (born 1993), Ukrainian tennis player

Places 
 Maryna, Podlaskie Voivodeship, a village in Poland

See also